This is a list of newspapers currently published in Aruba, grouped by language.

Multiple Languages
Official
 Government of Aruba News – English, Papiamento, and Dutch

Websites
 24ora – Papiamento and Spanish

Papiamento
Daily
 Awe Mainta
 Bon Dia Aruba
 Diario
 Solo di Pueblo
 Show y Mas

Websites
 Telearuba
 Aruba Native
 AWE24
 Mas Noticia
 NoticiaCla
 Solo di Pueblo

English
Daily
 Aruba Today – Same publisher as Bon Dia Aruba. Calls itself "Aruba's only English-language newspaper"

Dutch
Daily
 Amigoe – published throughout the ABC islands

Official
 Afkondigingsblad van Aruba (Official Gazette of Aruba)
 Landscourant van Aruba (Official Journal of Aruba)

See also
 List of newspapers

References

External links

Aruba
 
Newspapers